Gaiyari is a village and panchayat in Araria district in Bihar.

References

Villages in Araria district